Ernest Hume (5 February 1869 – 22 June 1912) was an Australian cricketer. He played five first-class matches for New South Wales in 1895/96.

See also
 List of New South Wales representative cricketers

References

External links
 

1869 births
1912 deaths
Australian cricketers
New South Wales cricketers
Cricketers from Sydney